Hüdavendigar Mosque or Murat I, the Hüdavendigar Mosque ( or 1. Murat Hüdavendigar Camii) is a historic mosque in Bursa, Turkey, that is part of the large complex (külliye) built by the Ottoman Sultan, Murad I, between 1365–1385 and is also named after the same sultan. It went under extensive renovation following the 1855 Bursa earthquake.

Architecture 
The mosque has a reversed T-plan and the Külliye further consists of a Madrasa) and dervish lodge (zaviye), mausoleum Türbe, fountain, a soup kitchen Imaret, a hamam and a Koran school for boys.

External links 
 Archnet file on Hudavendigar Mosque
 Pictures of the mosque during and after restoration

Religious buildings and structures completed in 1385
Ottoman mosques in Bursa
Osmangazi
14th-century mosques